"Die by the Drop" is the first single from The Dead Weather's second album Sea of Cowards. It was released on March 30, 2010 in the United States and April 25 in the UK. The single includes the B-side "Old Mary".

The video of the song was directed by Floria Sigismondi who also directed the videos for "Blue Orchid" by The White Stripes and "Broken Boy Soldier" by The Raconteurs, Jack White's other two bands. It is the band's first official video to show all of the Dead Weather members playing their instruments. Footage from the video was used in teaser trailers for the band's upcoming singles, "Blue Blood Blues", "Gasoline" and "Jawbreaker".

Track listing 
 A. "Die by the Drop"
 B. "Old Mary"

Reception
John Sakamoto for the Toronto Star said the song "sounds like it should weigh a tonne," with "relentless guitar riffs, throbbing drums, an insistent, plinking piano part, and very loud vocals by White and Alison Mosshart, who don't so much duet as shout at each other."

Chart positions

Personnel
 Alison Mosshart – guitar, vocals
 Dean Fertita – organ, guitar
 Jack Lawrence – bass
 Jack White – drums, vocals, production

References

The Dead Weather songs
2010 singles
Third Man Records singles
Songs written by Dean Fertita
Songs written by Jack Lawrence (musician)
Songs written by Alison Mosshart
2010 songs
Music videos directed by Floria Sigismondi